Dichlofluanid (N-dichlorofluoromethylthio-N′, N′-dimethyl-N-phenylsulfamide) is a fungicide used to protect strawberries, grapes, berries, apples, pears and other fruit, vegetables and ornamental plants from diseases such as apple scab (Venturia inaequalis), black spot, leather rot, gray mold, downy mildew and others caused by the fungi Botrytis, Alternaria, Sclerotinia, and Monilinia. It is also used to protect against diseases of fruit during storage, and as a wood preservative, often as part of a paint undercoat. 

Dichlofluanid was first marketed by Bayer Company in 1964, for use as a fungicide on plants. Its trade names include Euparen and Elvaron.

References

External links
Rocket NXT

Dichlofluanid toxicity reports, review - hazard potential, risk

Directive 98/8/EC concerning the placing of biocidal products on the market, Assessment Report Dichlofluanid

T.R. Roberts, D.H. Hutson, Metabolic Pathways of agrochemicals. Part one: Herbicides and Plant Growth Regulators, Royal Society of Chemistry Publishers, London (1998)

Fungicides
Organofluorides
Organochlorides
Sulfamides